Bacillosamine is a rare amino sugar first discovered in Bacillus subtilis.

References

Aldosamines
Hexosamines